Simakan Rural District is a rural district (dehestan) in the Central District of Bavanat County, Fars Province, Iran. At the 2006 census, its population was 2,047, in 522 families.  The rural district has 11 villages.

References 

Rural Districts of Fars Province
Bavanat County